Condom Cathedral is a Catholic church and former cathedral dedicated to Saint Peter in Condom, Gers, France. It was listed as a monument historique in 1840. It was formerly the seat of the Bishops of Condom; the diocese was added to the Archdiocese of Auch in 1822.

Building description
The cathedral dominates the town, which sits on a hill above the Baïse River. It was designed at the end of the 15th century and erected from 1506 to 1531, making it one of the last major buildings in the Gers region to be constructed in the Southern French Gothic style of south-west France. The church has buttresses all around and there is a  square tower over the west front. The west front door has the Four Evangelists' symbols in the tympanum, and the south nave door in the Flamboyant Gothic style has 24 small statues in the niches of the archivolt.

Inside, the wide aisleless nave is lit by the clerestory windows with grisaille glass. There is a neo-Gothic openwork screen from 1844 around the chancel, which demarcates it from the ambulatory. The stained glass in the choir is from the 19th century. This cathedral was famous for its sumptuous 16th-century liturgy and for its organ of 1605 at the west end. This is commemorated in the choir vault bosses with figures of angel musicians. The original pulpit with its delicately carved stone baldaquin is still in place. The 16th-century cloister is now a public passageway adjoining a car park, the exterior of which is illuminated at night.

References

External links

Location

Bibliography
 Jacques Gardelles, 1992: Aquitaine gothique. Picard, Paris 
 Marcel Durliat, 1970: La cathédrale et le cloître de Condom, pp.145-163, in Congrès archéologique de France. 128e session. Gascogne. 1970, Société française d'archéologie, Paris

Former cathedrals in France
Churches in Gers
Monuments historiques of Gers